Xanadu may refer to:

 Shangdu, the ancient summer capital of Kublai Khan's empire in China
 a metaphor for opulence or an idyllic place, based upon Samuel Taylor Coleridge's description of Shangdu in his poem Kubla Khan

Other places 
 Xanadu (Titan), an enigmatic bright feature on the surface of Saturn's moon, Titan
 Xanadu 2.0, the nickname of Bill Gates's house
 Xanadu Beach Resort & Marina, Freeport, Grand Bahama Island, Bahamas
 Xanadu Houses, a series of experimental homes built to showcase computers and automation in the home
 Madrid Xanadú, a large shopping precinct and entertainment centre in Spain
 Xanadu, the original name of the New Jersey mall American Dream Meadowlands

Art, entertainment, and media

Film, television, and theatre
 Xanadu (Citizen Kane), a mansion in the 1941 film Citizen Kane
 Xanadu (film), a 1980 film starring Olivia Newton-John
 Xanadu (musical), a 2007 Broadway musical based on the film
 Xanadu (TV series)
 Xanadu: The Marco Polo Musical, a 1953 Seventh Army musical
 Xanadu, a ballet by Mildred Couper
 Xanadu, a virtual world in "Garage Kids", the pilot of Code Lyoko

Music
 "The Legend of Xanadu", a hit song by Dave Dee, Dozy, Beaky, Mick & Tich (1968)
 Xanadu Records, a jazz record label
 Xanadu (Menudo album) (1981)
 Xanadu (soundtrack), the soundtrack of the film
 "Xanadu" (Olivia Newton-John and Electric Light Orchestra song) (1980)
 Xanadu (musical), Original Broadway Cast Recording
 "Xanadu" (Rush song) (1977)
 "Xanadu (A Vision in a Dream)", a 2001 song by Stormlord from At the Gates of Utopia
 "Xanadu", a 2007 song by Moi Dix Mois from Dixanadu
 "Xanadu", a song by Screw (2012)
 "Xanadu", a song by Moving Mountains from Moving Mountains
 "Xanadu", a song by the Party Animals (2003)
 "Xanadu", a song by The Ghost of a Saber Tooth Tiger (2014)
 "Xanadu", a song by Ummet Ozcan (2022)
 "Xanadu", a song by The Winery Dogs (2022)

Other media
 Xanadu (video game), a 1985 video game
 Faxanadu, a 1987 video game for the NES/Famicom
 Madame Xanadu, a DC comics character
 The home of comics character Mandrake the Magician

Other uses 
 Project Xanadu, an early non-markup hypertext project by Ted Nelson
 Philodendron xanadu, plant in the family Araceae 
 Xanadu, a shade of gray whose name is derived from the Philodendron
 Xanadu Quantum Technologies, a photonic quantum computing company based out of Toronto, Canada
 AirAsia X, airline (callsign XANADU)
 A former name of American Dream Meadowlands, a retail and entertainment complex in East Rutherford, New Jersey

See also 
 
 
 Shanadoo, a Japanese dance and pop girl group
 Shangdu (disambiguation)
 Shangri-La (disambiguation)